Joanne Leonard is an American photographer, photo collage artist, and feminist based in Ann Arbor, Michigan. Her work has been included in major art history textbooks and has been shown internationally in galleries and museums.

Early life
Joanne Leonard was born in Los Angeles in 1940 to P. Alfred Leonard, originally of Mannheim, Germany, and Marjorie Rosenfeld Leonard. She has a twin sister, Eleanor (Rubin), who is also an artist, and a younger sister, Barbara (Handelman). She received a B.A. in Social Science from the University of California in 1962. As infants, she and her twin sister were cast as a baby in The Lady Is Willing starring Marlene Dietrich.

Career
Leonard is known for her photographs and photo collages depicting private moments and personal struggles from women's lives once considered either taboo or unimportant. Her work struck a chord with the art world in the later part of the 20th century, and she was one of the few female artists to be featured in the 3rd edition of H.W. Janson’s History of Art. Her photograph, Julia and the Window of Vulnerability was chosen to illustrate the opening of the chapter, "The Modern World" in the 1991 edition of Gardner's Art Through the Ages.

She was an official photographer for the 1972 Winter Olympics.

She taught art and interdisciplinary courses at the University of Michigan’s Penny W. Stamps School of Art & Design and now holds the title of Diane M. Kirkpatrick and Griselda Pollock Distinguished University Professor Emerita. She has one daughter, Julia.

Collections
Leonard's work is held by major collections, including the University of Michigan Museum of Art, The Metropolitan Museum of Art, the Los Angeles County Museum of Art, the Iris & B. Gerald Cantor Center for Visual Arts, the San Francisco Museum of Modern Art., and the International Center of Photography in New York City. The Museum of Modern Art in New York holds 62 of her photographs, all of which are digitized and available on their website.

Bibliography

Further reading

References

1940 births
Living people
20th-century American photographers
University of Michigan faculty
20th-century American women photographers
University of California alumni
American women academics
21st-century American women